Emerald Hill was an electoral district of the Victorian Legislative Assembly, Australia. It covered part of the inner-city suburb South Melbourne and consisted part of the previous Electoral district of South Melbourne which was abolished in 1859. (The other part of the South Melbourne electorate became the Electoral district of Sandridge).

1859
Emerald Hill was first proclaimed in 1859, and was defined in the Victorian Electoral Act, 1858 (which took effect at the 1859 elections) as: 

 This point is approximately where Wurundjeri Way crosses the south bank of the river now.

1889
Emerald Hill was redefined as a single-member electorate by the Electoral Act Amendment Act 1888 (which took effect at the 1889 elections) as:
 That part of the pre-1888 district immediately south of the Yarra became the Electoral district of Melbourne South.

Parts of the electorate were later amalgamated into the Electoral district of Albert Park.

Members for Emerald Hill

References

Former electoral districts of Victoria (Australia)
1859 establishments in Australia
1904 disestablishments in Australia